Following is a comprehensive list of all Article III and Article IV United States federal judges appointed by President Barack Obama during his presidency, as well as a partial list of Article I federal judicial appointments, excluding appointments to the District of Columbia judiciary.

The total number of Obama Article III judgeship nominees to be confirmed by the United States Senate is 329, including two justices to the Supreme Court of the United States, 55 judges to the United States Courts of Appeals, 268 judges to the United States district courts, and four judges to the United States Court of International Trade. Obama did not make any recess appointments to the federal courts.

In terms of Article I courts, Obama made 8 appointments to the United States Tax Court, 3 appointments to the United States Court of Federal Claims, 3 appointments to the United States Court of Appeals for Veterans Claims, 2 appointments to the United States Court of Military Commission Review, and 2 appointments to the United States Court of Appeals for the Armed Forces. He also elevated two chief judges of the Court of Federal Claims.

On the Article IV territorial courts, President Obama made two appointments and elevated one judge to the position of chief judge.

United States Supreme Court justices

Courts of appeals

District courts

United States Court of International Trade (Article III)

Specialty courts (Article I)

United States Court of Federal Claims

United States Tax Court

United States Court of Appeals for Veterans Claims

United States Court of Appeals for the Armed Forces

United States Court of Military Commission Review

Territorial courts (Article IV)

See also
 Federal Judicial Center
 Barack Obama judicial appointment controversies
 Barack Obama Supreme Court candidates

Notes 

Courts

Renominations

References
General

 

Specific

Obama
Judicial appointments
2010s politics-related lists
2000s politics-related lists
Barack Obama-related lists